Choiril Hidayat (born April 29, 1994) is an Indonesian professional footballer who plays for Liga 2 club PSGC Ciamis as a midfielder.

Career 
Choiril made his debut on November 13, 2017 with PSMS in 2017 Liga 2, the big Eight round replaced Elthon Maran's accumulated card. He scored the opening goal in the 22nd minute against Martapura F.C. with the final score 2-1 win at Patriot Chandrabhaga Stadium in Bekasi.

Personal life 
Choiril Hidayat has a twin brother named Choirul Hidayat who in 2017 Liga 2 one club in PSMS Medan.  Choiril and Choirul were formerly active TNI members.

Honours

Club
PSMS Medan
 Liga 2 runner-up: 2017

References

External links 
 

1994 births
Living people
Indonesian footballers
Sportspeople from West Java
People from Sukabumi
PSMS Medan players
PS TIRA players
Liga 1 (Indonesia) players
Liga 2 (Indonesia) players
Indonesian twins
Twin sportspeople
Association football forwards